Thomas Washington (T-AGOR-10) was a Robert D. Conrad-class oceanographic research ship delivered to the U.S. Navy in 1965. The ship was owned by the Navy but assigned to the Scripps Institute of Oceanography, University of California, La Jolla, California and operated as R/VThomas Washington from delivery to inactivation.

In September 1992 the ship was sold to Chile and operated by the Chilean Navy as Vidal Gormaz until decommissioned in  August 2010 and broken up in 2012.

Construction
Thomas Washington was laid down on 12 September 1963 at Marinette, Wisconsin, by the Marinette Marine Corp.; launched on 1 August 1964; sponsored jointly by Misses Barbara E. and Ann H. Washington, granddaughters of Admiral Thomas Washington; and delivered to the Navy on 17 September 1965.

The ship was  length overall,  beam,  draft,  with a displacement tonnage of 1,490. In addition to the main engine the ship had a retractable, trainable, 360 degree bow thruster. The ship was operated with eight officers and fifteen crew with a scientific complement of twenty-two.

For equipment handling and operation there was an "A" frame of  capacity, crane with  capacity and three oceanographic/hydrographic winches.

In 1967 an IBM 1800 computer, the first of its kind installed in a research vessel, for data acquisition and control was installed allowing data processing at sea rather than after operations with land-based computers. By retirement Thomas Washington had been equipped with a Furuno shallow water sounding system and for deep sounding both EDO narrow beam and a SeaBeam swath system. The ship had a capability for seismic profiling.

Operation
The ship was assigned to the Scripps Institute of Oceanography, of the University of California as one of three such ships operated by academic institutions as parts of the national academic research fleet; the others being R/V Robert D. Conrad operated by the Lamont–Doherty Earth Observatory of Columbia University and R/V Thomas G. Thompson operated by the University of Washington. The Navy owned ships operated under the general control of the Oceanographer of the Navy, but were managed by the institutions, with civilian crews, conducting research experiments in support of the national oceanographic programs of the United States.

The ship's operation schedule for 1991, its last full operation year, shows the ship operated for a variety of purposes with numerous sponsors.

Inactivation
Thomas Washington, reaching the 1992 end of life projection, was inactivated and struck by the Navy 1 August 1992.

Chilean service
The ship was sold to Chile for operation by the Chilean Navy, renamed Vidal Gormaz for the founder of the Chilean Hydrographic Office, Commodore Francisco Vidal Gormaz (1837 - 1907), and commissioned at San Diego, California on 28 September 1992. Vidal Gormaz arrived at Valparaíso on 3 December 1992. The vessel participated in such research operations as Tropical Ocean Global Atmosphere, World Ocean Circulation Experiment, El Niño–Southern Oscillation and national Marine Scientific Research Voyages in National Fiords and Oceanic Islands and other Chilean scientific data collection.

The ship, designated AGOR-60, was decommissioned by the Chilean Navy on 30 August 2010. She was broken up at Chinquique, Puerto Montt in 2012.

Footnotes

References

External links
 "The Mid-Ocean Ridge" — description in Scientific American of SeaBeam survey aboard Thomas Washington
 History of UNOLS

 

Robert D. Conrad-class oceanographic research ships
University-National Oceanographic Laboratory System research vessels
Ships built by Marinette Marine
1964 ships
Scripps Institution of Oceanography
Ships transferred from the United States Navy to the Chilean Navy
Auxiliary ships of the Chilean Navy
Auxiliary ships of Chile